Euphorbia spiralis is a species of plant in the family Euphorbiaceae. It is endemic to Yemen.

References

Endemic flora of Socotra
spiralis
Least concern plants
Taxonomy articles created by Polbot
Taxa named by Isaac Bayley Balfour